A by-election was held for the New South Wales Legislative Assembly electorate of East Sydney on 23 February 1870 because Henry Parkes had also been elected to Kiama and chose to resign from East Sydney.

Dates

Result

Henry Parkes was also elected for Kiama and chose to resign from East Sydney.

See also
Electoral results for the district of East Sydney
List of New South Wales state by-elections

References

1870 elections in Australia
New South Wales state by-elections
1870s in New South Wales